Arthur Beadsworth (September 1876 – 9 October 1917) was an English professional football who played in the Football League for Burton United, Manchester United and Leicester Fosse as a forward.

Personal life 
Beadsworth briefly served in the Leicestershire Regiment and the King's Royal Rifle Corps of the British Army in the early 1890s, before being discharged for being underage. He married in 1897, had four children and later worked as a shoe hand in Hinckley after his retirement from professional football in 1906. After the outbreak of the First World War in August 1914, Beadsworth re-enlisted in the Leicestershire Regiment. His battalion was deployed to the Western Front in July 1915 and by March 1916 he had risen to the rank of sergeant. Beadsworth was gassed during the Third Battle of Ypres, and he was transferred to Wimereux, France, where he died of his wounds on 9 October 1917. He was buried in Wimereux Communal Cemetery.

Career statistics

References

External links
MUFCInfo.com profile

1876 births
Footballers from Leicester
English footballers
Association football inside forwards
English Football League players
British Army personnel of World War I
1917 deaths
Royal Leicestershire Regiment soldiers
King's Royal Rifle Corps soldiers
Leicester City F.C. players
Association football outside forwards
Coventry City F.C. players
Nuneaton Borough F.C. players
Hinckley United F.C. players
Manchester United F.C. players
Swindon Town F.C. players
Gillingham F.C. players
Burton United F.C. players
Southern Football League players
British military personnel killed in World War I
Military personnel from Leicester